Arvo Kraam (born 23 February 1971) is a retired football defender from Estonia. He played for several clubs in his native country, and for Tampere United in Finland.

International career
Kraam earned his first official cap for the Estonia national football team on 19 May, 1995, when Estonia played Latvia at the Baltic Cup 1995. He obtained a total number of three caps.

References

1971 births
Living people
Estonian footballers
Estonia international footballers
Association football defenders
Expatriate footballers in Finland
Tampere United players